Sunder Prakasham (born 14 October 1972) is an Indian entrepreneur. He is the CEO of TTK Services Pvt. Ltd and the Managing Director of HomeShikari.

Early life and education
Sunder was born into a South Indian family. His father was a clerk in the railways, and his mother was a teacher. Sunder holds a bachelor's degree in Computer science Engineering, following which, he obtained his Masters of Business Administration degree from Bharathiar University, Tamil Nadu in India.

Career
Sunder began his career with an IT company in Chennai. After a 4-year stint, he quit his job to work on his start-up, a ‘scanmail’ service, run by him and his friends.
From the year 2004, he spearheaded the formation of TTK Services Pvt. Ltd and led its three divisions’ viz., YourManInIndia,  GetFriday  and HomeShikari.

References

Indian chief executives
Businesspeople from Tamil Nadu
1972 births
Living people
TTK Group